Aethes margarotana is a species of moth of the family Tortricidae. It was described by Philogène Auguste Joseph Duponchel in 1836. It is found in most of Europe (except Ireland, the Benelux, Fennoscandia, Poland, the Baltic region, Switzerland and part of the Balkan Peninsula), Russia, North Africa and Iran. The habitat consists of sand-dunes and shingle beaches.

The larvae feed on the flowers of Eryngium maritimum.

References

margarotana
Moths described in 1836
Moths of Asia
Moths of Europe
Moths of Africa
Taxa named by Philogène Auguste Joseph Duponchel